Karpatendeutsche Ärzteschaft ('Carpathian German Medical College') was an organization of Carpathian German physicians in the World War II-era Slovak Republic. The organization was incorporated into the People's Welfare and People's Health Department (Amt für Volkswohlfahrt und Volksgesundheit) of the German Party. 

Dr. Adalbert Gabriel was the Head Physician of Karpatendeutsche Ärzteschaft in the Zips District.

References

Medical and health organisations based in Slovakia